The Crime Doctor's Diary is a 1949 American mystery film directed by Seymour Friedman and starring Warner Baxter, Stephen Dunne and Lois Maxwell. It is the last of the Crime Doctor series of films made by Columbia Pictures.

Plot

Cast
 Warner Baxter as Dr. Robert Ordway  
 Stephen Dunne as Steve Carter  
 Lois Maxwell as Jane Darrin  
 Adele Jergens as Inez Gray  
 Robert Armstrong as George 'Goldie' Harrigan  
 Don Beddoe as Phillip Bellem  
 Whit Bissell as Pete Bellem

References

Bibliography
 Erickson, Hal. From Radio to the Big Screen: Hollywood Films Featuring Broadcast Personalities and Programs. McFarland, 2014.

External links
 
 
 
 

1949 films
1949 mystery films
1940s English-language films
American mystery films
Films directed by Seymour Friedman
Columbia Pictures films
American black-and-white films
Films with screenplays by Edward Anhalt
Crime Doctor (character) films
1940s American films